Kim Yoo-jung (born September 22, 1999) is a South Korean actress. After her acting debut in 2003, she became one of the best known child actresses in Korea and since then, has transitioned into teen roles by starring in television series Moon Embracing the Sun (2012), May Queen (2012) and Angry Mom (2015). She hosted music show Inkigayo from November 2014 to April 2016 and took on her first leading role in KBS2's historical drama Love in the Moonlight (2016).

Film

Television series

Web series

Musical

Theater

Television show

Web shows

Hosting

Reality show

Music video appearances

References

South Korean filmographies